General Wolcott may refer to:

Erastus Wolcott (1722–1793), Connecticut State Militia brigadier general in the American Revolutionary War
Oliver Wolcott (1726–1797), Connecticut State Militia major general in the American Revolutionary War

See also
Attorney General Wolcott (disambiguation)